Elvira Karin Öberg  (born 26 February 1999) is a Swedish biathlete. She is the younger sister of Olympic champion Hanna Öberg. Elvira won three gold medals in the youth category at the 2018 Biathlon Junior World Championships in Otepää; in the 10 km individual, the 3 × 6 km relay and the 6 km sprint respectively. Öberg placed twelfth in the sprint in her Biathlon World Cup debut in Östersund, 1 December 2019. At the Olympic Games in Beijing in 2022 she won the silver medal in the sprint race, following up with a silver in the pursuit.

Biathlon results
All results are sourced from the International Biathlon Union.

Olympic Games
3 medals (1 gold, 2 silver)

World Championships

World Cup

Individual podiums
 5 victories 
 14 podiums

Team podiums
5 victories 
13 podiums  

*Results are from IBU races which include the Biathlon World Cup, Biathlon World Championships and the Winter Olympic Games.

Personal life 
Her sister Hanna Öberg is a professional biathlete who competes with her for the Swedish Women Biathlon team.

References

External links

1999 births
Living people
Swedish female biathletes
Biathletes at the 2022 Winter Olympics
Olympic biathletes of Sweden
Medalists at the 2022 Winter Olympics
Olympic gold medalists for Sweden
Olympic silver medalists for Sweden
Olympic medalists in biathlon
People from Kiruna Municipality
21st-century Swedish women
Biathlon World Championships medalists